There are approximately 372,905 listed buildings in England and 2.5% of these are Grade I. This page is a list of these buildings in the county of Buckinghamshire, by district.

Aylesbury Vale

|}

Chiltern

|}

Milton Keynes

|}

South Bucks

|}

Wycombe

|}

Notes

See also
 Grade II* listed buildings in Buckinghamshire

References

External links

 
Buckinghamshire